Steven Pereira (born 13 April 1994) is a professional footballer who plays as a right-back for Sumgayit. Born in the Netherlands, he represents the Cape Verde national football team. He formerly played for PEC Zwolle in the Dutch Eredivisie, MVV Maastricht and Bulgarian club CSKA Sofia.

Club career
On 4 July 2022, Azerbaijan Premier League club Sumgayit announced the singing of Pereira to a two-year contract, with the option of an additional year.

International career
Born in the Netherlands and of Cape Verdean descent, Pereira debuted for the Cape Verde national football team in a 2–1 2018 FIFA World Cup qualification victory over South Africa on 1 September 2017.

Honours

Club
PEC Zwolle
Johan Cruyff Shield: 2014

References

External links
 Voetbal International profile 
 

1994 births
Living people
Citizens of Cape Verde through descent
Cape Verdean footballers
Dutch footballers
Association football fullbacks
Cape Verde international footballers
Dutch sportspeople of Cape Verdean descent
PEC Zwolle players
MVV Maastricht players
PFC CSKA Sofia players
C.D. Santa Clara players
Académico de Viseu F.C. players
Eredivisie players
Eerste Divisie players
First Professional Football League (Bulgaria) players
Liga Portugal 2 players
Cape Verdean expatriate footballers
Cape Verdean expatriate sportspeople in Bulgaria
Expatriate footballers in Bulgaria
Footballers from Rotterdam